JNS may refer to:
 Curtiss JNS, a biplane
 Jamnabai Narsee School, in Mumbai, India
 Jaunsari language
 Jawaharlal Nehru Stadium (disambiguation)
 Jewish News Syndicate
 Narsaq Heliport, in Greenland
 Yugoslav National Party